Edward Lowe (11 July 1925 – 9 March 2009) was an English professional footballer who played for Aston Villa and Fulham, making the second-all-time club record appearances for Fulham of 511, behind Johnny Haynes, between 1950 and 1963. He was also an England international and later, the manager for Notts County. Lowe died on 9 March 2009 in Nottingham.

References
General
England profile
Aston Villa profile

Specific

1925 births
2009 deaths
People from Halesowen
English footballers
Aston Villa F.C. players
Fulham F.C. players
Notts County F.C. players
England international footballers
English football managers
Notts County F.C. managers
Association football wing halves
English Football League players
English Football League managers